The Harp in the South is the debut novel by Australian author Ruth Park. Published in 1948, it portrays the life of a Catholic Irish Australian family living in the Sydney suburb of Surry Hills, which was at that time an inner city slum.

Publication History
The Harp in the South was published, initially, in the Sydney Morning Herald in twelve daily instalments, beginning on 4 January 1947, after winning a competition run by that newspaper. The prize was £2,000, and there were 175 entries.

It was controversial, with readers writing to the newspaper, on the basis of the synopsis, even before the serialisation started. Delia Falconer writes that The Herald published "forty-three responses, a symposium, and a daily tally of pro and con letters (sixty-eight for; fifty-four against)". It was published in book form in 1948 by Angus & Robertson, who baulked at the novel but "had to honour a ‘gentleman’s agreement’ to publish the winner".

Nonetheless, it has become a classic and has never been out of print.

Characters 
Hughie Darcy:
Married to Margaret Darcy. Hughie often becomes drunk after work and his best friend is Patrick Diamond, even though Patrick is Protestant and he is Catholic. He is the father of Rowena and Dolour.  Hughie wants to get out of Surry Hills and back to the bush but he has a family to support so is trapped.
Margaret “Mumma” Darcy:
Mother of Rowena and Dolour, mother-in-law of Charlie Rothe. She is a devout Catholic and although generally accepting, sometimes fights with Patrick Diamond (their lodger) over his religious beliefs.
Rowena "Roie" Darcy:
Married to Charlie Rothe, they have one child, Moira, known as “Motty”. In her youth, she was courted by Tommy Mendel, but after sleeping with her, he disappeared. Roie secretly works at two jobs to save enough for an abortion when she discovers she is expecting Tommy's baby, but at the last minute cannot go through with it. On her way home, she is attacked and savagely beaten by a group of sailors and loses the  baby.
Charlie Rothe:
Charlie is assumed to be part Aboriginal although he does not know his parents as he was taken away as a baby and put in a home. He is married to Rowena Darcy whom he met when her younger sister, Dolour took part in a radio quiz show,  "Junior Information Please".  Roie was feeling sick and he helped her outside for air. Charlie knows there is no racial prejudice with Roie but Margaret does not accept him at first and Dolour is angry with him for stealing Roie from her.
Dolour Darcy:
Dolour is the youngest in her family. A very bright girl, she aspires to get a good education and escape from Surry Hills. She is aunty to "Motty" Roie's child and good friends with elderly Chinese greengrocer, Lick Jimmy.
Patrick Diamond:
The Darcy’s fervent Protestant lodger. Every St. Patrick's day, he gets drunk and verbally abuses Mrs. Darcy. When he suffers a stroke, Lick Jimmy performs an emergency 'bleed' by cutting open a vein to ease the pressure. Pat was unaware of this, as he had passed out because Hughie, also drunk, had hit him.
Miss Sheily:
Mother to disabled Johnny Sheily, she constantly abuses him. When he is knocked down and killed she seems relieved rather than upset. Later, Roie sees her flagellating herself and crying Johnny's name. She marries a Swedish man named Gunnarson.

Sequel and prequel 
In 1949, Ruth Park published Poor Man's Orange as a sequel to The Harp in the South. A prequel, Missus, was published in 1985.

Adaptations

1949 stage adaptation 
Park and Leslie Rees collaborated on a stage adaptation of The Harp in the South. It was first presented at the Independent Theatre in Sydney in March 1949.

1964 British TV version

The book was adapted for British TV in 1964. It was directed by an Australian, Alan Burke, with many Australians in the cast including Ed Devereaux.

Alan Burke had written a musical adaption of Harp in the South which has not been professionally produced.

Cast
Ed Devereaux as Hughie Darcy
Brenda Dunrich as Mumma Darcy
Bettina Dickson as Delie Stock
Veronica Lang as Roie Darcy
Andy Ho as Lick Jimmy
Muguette De Braie as Rosa Siciliano
George Roderick as Luigi Siciliano
Colette Martin as Dolour Darcy
Moya O'Sullivan as Miss Sheily
Bill Levis as Johnny Sheily
Kevin Brennan as Patrick Diamond
Lew Luton as Tommy Mendel

1986 and 1987 miniseries
The Harp in the South and its sequel Poor Man's Orange were adapted into TV miniseries, the former in 1986, the latter in 1987.

The Harp in the South and Poor Man's Orange have been released by Roadshow Entertainment as a 3-DVD package.

Cast

2014 stage script adaptation 
In 2013 & 2014 G.bod Theatre in association with NIDA Independent, developed a new adaptation of Ruth Park's original novel. This was the first adaptation approved by Ruth Park's estate since 1949. An invited audience saw the development in progress, at NIDA, in both 2013 and 2014. The adaptation has yet to be staged.

2018 stage adaptation 
Kate Mulvany adapted The Harp in the South, its prequel and sequel into a six-hour play over two-parts. It was first produced by the Sydney Theatre Company at the Roslyn Packer Theatre from August 2018, directed by Kip Williams.

References

External links 

1964 adaptation at Austlit
1964 TV adaptation at IMDb
Harp in the South at Australian Screen Online

1948 Australian novels
1980s Australian television miniseries
Network 10 original programming
Period television series
Novels set in Sydney
Novels by Ruth Park
Surry Hills, New South Wales
Irish-Australian culture
1948 debut novels
Angus & Robertson books